The Musée Branly can refer to either of two museums in Paris:

 Musée du quai Branly, an art museum
 Musée Edouard Branly, the laboratory of radio pioneer Edouard Branly

See also 
 List of museums in Paris